Greatrex is a surname, shared by:

John Greatrex (born 1936), English cricketer
Neil Greatrex (1951–2019), British miners' union president
Stan Greatrex, motorcycle speedway rider in the 1930s 
Tim Greatrex, British television executive
Tom Greatrex (born 1974), British Labour Party politician

See also 
Greatrex Newman (1892–1984), English author, songwriter and screenwriter
Greatorex
Greatrakes